Constantine Demetrius Mourouzis, (1730 – 1 May 1787) was a Phanariote Prince of Moldavia, and member of the Mourousis family. A remarkable polyglot, he spoke five languages: Greek, Latin, French, Arabic and Turkish.

In 1761, he became Grand Postelnic (foreign minister) in Moldavia, and soon after Dragoman of the Fleet (deputy minister) of the Ottoman Admiralty, and eventually Grand Dragoman. There are indications that he was politically involved in the dismissal and assassination of his predecessor, Grigore III Ghica, by the Porte. Trusted by the Porte, he obtained the throne of Moldavia on October 12, 1770.

Mourouzis spent much of his time in Iaşi, supervising the gathering of agricultural resources demanded by the Porte, but also fought extravagant luxury and surrounded himself with scholars, paying particular attention to schools and founding scholarships. He was deposed on June 7, 1782 and exiled to the island of Tenedos. He returned in 1783, but died soon after.

Notes

1783 deaths
Dragomans of the Porte
Constantine
Rulers of Moldavia
Postelnici of Moldavia
Year of birth unknown
Dragomans of the Fleet
1730 births
18th-century translators
Constantinopolitan Greeks
Diplomats from Istanbul